Whore is the sixth and most recent studio album by Canadian singer Dalbello, released in 1996. It is a concept album and is notable for her direction change from electronic rock (she) to a more avantgarde soundscape, mixing alternative rock with hard rock, metal, gothic rock and funk influences. The song "Eleven" was chosen and as album's lead single, and a promotional video was released. All songs from the album were written by Lisa Dalbello and her brother Stefano Dalbello, except for track 6, written by Stefano Dalbello and his wife Dani Elwell. Critically acclaimed, the album's singles received moderate airplay in Canada.

Lisa Dalbello says about the album:

Track listing

Singles
Released only in Europe and Canada as promotional singles:
 eLeVeN
 eLeVen - 4:53
 whore - 4:22
 whore (Alternate Version) - 4:41
 Heavy Boots
 Heavy Boots (Clawfinger Mix 1) - 4:08
 Heavy Boots (Clawfinger Mix 2) - 4:30
 Heavy Boots (Album Version) - 4:31
 O Lil' Boy
 O Lil' Boy (Uncle Moon's Big Boy Mix) - 7:09
 O Lil' Boy (Uncle Moon's Long Big Boy Mix) - 4:00
 O Lil' Boy (Album Version) - 4:10

Additional tracks from recording session
 "Start Today" from Alex Lifeson's album Victor. Dalbello provides the lead vocals on the track.

Personnel
Dalbello - Vocals, Keyboards, Bass, Guitars
Alain Johannes, Justin Clayton, Tim Welch, Kevin Breit - Guitars
Richard Benoit - Bass, Fuzz Bass
Ric Markmann, Steve Webster - Bass
Ricky Lazar - Dumbec
Stefano Dalbello - Clavinet, Percussion, Guitars
Randy Cooke, Tommy Lee - Drums
Gord Prior - Jew's Harp, Backing Vocals
Floria Sigismondi - Photography

In other media
Lyrics quoted and album abundantly praised in Le Théâtre des Opérations by Maurice Dantec.

Notes

External links
Video single:  "eLeVeN"
Whore at discogs: link

1996 albums
Lisa Dalbello albums
EMI Records albums